Rukmini Maitra is an Indian actress and model. After having established herself in the world of fashion, Maitra made her debut in films in 2017 with the film Chaamp. She acted in six films with Dev. She had her Bollywood debut opposite Vidyut Jammwal in the 2021 film Sanak.

Career
Rukmini started her career as a model at the age of 13. She has modelled for various regional, national and international brands and magazines such as Reliance, Lakmé, Vodafone, Sunsilk, Parachute, Titan, Tata Tea, Rado, Elle, Harper's Bazaar, Femina, Royal Stag, PC Chandra Jewellers, Bhima Jewellers, Azva, Senco Gold, Spencer's, ITC, Fiama Di Wills, Big Bazar Fb, Lux, Emami, and has also modelled for eminent fashion designers like Masaba Gupta, Anita Dongre, Suneet Varma, Dev r Nil, Anju Modi etc.

Maitra debuted in the silver screen with the Bengali film titled Champ opposite Bengali actor Dev, which released in Eid, 2017. The film was directed by Raj Chakraborty. It is based on Boxing, a theme that is being explored in Bengali cinema for the very first time.

Personal life
Maitra is in a relationship with fellow actor Dev.

Filmography

Reality shows

Awards and nominations

See also
 Cinema of West Bengal

References

External links
 
 

Actresses in Bengali cinema
Female models from Kolkata
Living people
Bengali actresses
Bengali Hindus
21st-century Indian actresses
Actresses from Kolkata
Indian film actresses
1991 births